Baring is an unincorporated community and census-designated place (CDP) in King County, Washington, United States. The population was 220 at the 2010 United States Census.
The settlement was first known as "Salmon", but by 1909 it was known as Baring.

Geography
Baring is located in northeastern King County at  (47.763755, -121.476079) in the valley of the South Fork Skykomish River. US-2 leads southeast  to Skykomish and northwest  to Everett.
 

Demographics
As of the 2000 United States Census, there were 233 people, 105 households, and 59 families in the CDP. The population density was 139.0 people per square mile (53.5/km²). There were 207 housing units at an average density of 123.5/sq mi (47.6/km²). The racial makeup of the CDP was 90.56% White, 2.58% Native American, 0.86% Asian, 0.43% Pacific Islander, and 5.58% from two or more races. Hispanic or Latino of any race were 2.15% of the population.

There were 105 households, out of which 22.9% had children under the age of 18 living with them, 49.5% were married couples living together, 4.8% had a female householder with no husband present, and 43.8% were non-families. 32.4% of all households were made up of individuals, and 4.8% had someone living alone who was 65 years of age or older. The average household size was 2.22 and the average family size was 2.81.

The population contained 19.7% under the age of 18, 3.0% from 18 to 24, 37.8% from 25 to 44, 29.2% from 45 to 64, and 10.3% who were 65 years of age or older. The median age was 40 years. For every 100 females there were 121.9 males. For every 100 females age 18 and over, there were 122.6 males.

The median income for a household in the CDP was $40,875, and the median income for a family was $46,500. Males had a median income of $38,125 versus $32,292 for females. The per capita income for the CDP was $22,571. About 6.9% of families and 7.2% of the population were below the poverty line, including 5.4% of those under the age of eighteen and none of those 65 or over.

Climate
According to the Köppen Climate Classification system, Baring has an Oceanic climate, abbreviated "Cfb" on climate maps.

References

Census-designated places in King County, Washington